Riders of the Plains is a 1924 American silent Western film serial directed by Jacques Jaccard for Arrow Films. It was co-written by Karl R. Coolidge and Jacques Jaccard. This serial was one of Boris Karloff's early (uncredited) film appearances. Chapter one premiered on October 1, 1924, and the final chapter played theaters on December 22, 1924 The serial is considered a lost film.

Cast
 Jack Perrin
 Marilyn Mills
 Ruth Royce
 Charles Brinley
 Kingsley Benedict
 Running Elk
 Robert Miles
 Rhody Hathaway
 Clark Comstock
 Boris Karloff in a bit part

Chapter Titles 
 1. Red Shadows 
 2. Dangerous Hazards 
 3. A Living Death 
 4. Flames of Fury 
 5. Morgan's Raid 
 6. Out of the Past 
 7. A Fighting Gamble 
 8. A Prisoner of War 
 9. Pawns of Destiny 
 10. Riding for Life 
 11. In Death's Shadow 
 12. Flaming Vengeance 
 13. Thundering Hoofs 
 14. Red Talons 
 15. The Reckoning

See also
 List of film serials
 List of film serials by studio
 Boris Karloff filmography

References

External links
 

1924 films
1924 Western (genre) films
American black-and-white films
Films directed by Jacques Jaccard
American silent serial films
Silent American Western (genre) films
1920s American films
1920s English-language films